Local Honey is the third studio album by Brian Fallon, singer/guitarist of American rock band The Gaslight Anthem, released on March 27, 2020, through Lesser Known Records.

Singles
"You Have Stolen My Heart" was released as the lead single from the album on December 9, 2019. "21 Days" was released as the second single from the album on January 17, 2020. "When You're Ready" was released as the third single from the album on March 27, 2020.

Background
Talking about the album, Fallon said, "Every single song is about right now. There’s nothing on this record that has to do with the past or even the future, it just has to do with the moments that are presented and things that I’ve learned and I’m finding in my day to day. This record is 100 percent about the day today. It’s not about these glorious dreams or miserable failures, it’s just about life and how I see it."

Critical reception

Local Honey received generally positive reviews from music critics. At Metacritic, which assigns a normalised rating out of 100 to reviews from mainstream publications, the album received an average score of 77, based on nine reviews, indicating "generally favorable reviews".

AllMusic's James Christopher Monger reviewed the album positively, stating, "Local Honey is an inside record that's better-suited for humid mornings and overcast afternoons than the open highway. In looking stridently inward, Fallon has crafted his most homespun and relatable outing to date." Kerrang!'s James Hickie reviewed the album positively, stating, "At just eight tracks long, Local Honey doesn’t stick around nearly long enough. That’s certainly not a charge you’d level against a release you don’t enjoy, which Brian is still yet to make. As well as being excellent, Local Honey is evidence that the man himself is able to adjust his songwriting to his circumstances without compromising in its quality. It all makes for a seriously sweet listen that reaffirms the Jersey boy as a storyteller and songwriter par excellence."

Track listing

Personnel
Credits adapted from AllMusic.
 Brian Fallon – composer, guitars, piano, primary artist, vocals

Musicians
 Thomas Bartlett – keyboards, piano
 Chris Farren – keyboards, vocals
 Kori Gardner – background vocals
 Peter Katis – keyboards
 Kurt Leon – drums, guitars, percussion
 Ian Perkins – bass, guitars
 Eric Sanderson – bass
 Ian Tait – bass, upright bass

Technical personnel
 Kelsey Hunter Ayres – art direction, photography
 Thomas Bartlett – programming
 Greg Calbi – mastering
 Chris Farren – programming
 Greg Giorgio – engineer
 Laurens Grossen – assistant
 Chance Halter – assistant
 Peter Katis – engineer, mixing, producer, programming
 Kurt Leon – engineer
 Eric Sanderson – programming
 Johannes Weinberger – design, layout

Charts

Release history

See also
List of 2020 albums

References

2020 albums
Brian Fallon albums